Dorothea Glenys Thornton, Baroness Thornton (born 16 October 1952), known as Glenys Thornton, is a Labour and Co-operative politician serving as a Member of the House of Lords since 1998. She was a Government Whip in 2008 to 2010 and a Parliamentary Under-Secretary of State for Health in 2010.

Career
Thornton was raised in Bradford, and graduated from the London School of Economics. She was Political Secretary of the Royal Arsenal Co-operative Society from 1981, joining the public affairs team of the Co-operative Wholesale Society upon their merger in 1985 and working there until 1992. She was General Secretary of the Fabian Society from 1993 to 1996. Since June 2015 she has been Chief Executive of the Young Foundation.

On 23 July 1998 Thornton was created a Life peer by Tony Blair, with the title Baroness Thornton, of Manningham in the County of West Yorkshire. She chaired the Social Enterprise Coalition until January 2008, when she was appointed a junior minister of the House of Lords. In September 2007, she was made chair of the advisory group that trains public sector staff to work with the voluntary sector. In May 2012, her role in Labour was moved from health to equalities, with her role on the health portfolio being taken over by Lord Hunt.

In 2019, she welcomed the Equality and Human Rights Commission response to complaints by the Jewish Labour Movement and Campaign Against Antisemitism about alleged antisemitism in the Labour Party in a tweet to Kate Osamor MP, confusing her with another female black MP, Dawn Butler, the Shadow Women & Equalities Secretary.

Personal life
Thornton lives in Gospel Oak, North London, and is married to internet safety expert John Carr. They have two adult children.

She is an Honorary Associate of the National Secular Society.

In 2009, she was reported to be claiming £22,000 a year in expenses by saying that her mother's bungalow in Yorkshire is her main home, amounting to around £130,000 between 2002 and 2009. She was later cleared of any wrongdoing by Michael Pownall, the Clerk of Parliaments, after it was determined that she spent much of her time there while caring for her mother.

References

External links
 Announcement of her introduction at the House of Lords House of Lords minutes of proceedings, 27 July 1998
 Social Enterprise Coalition

1952 births
Living people
Thornton, Dorothea G
Labour Co-operative life peers
Alumni of the London School of Economics
Members of the Fabian Society
Politicians from Bradford
Life peeresses created by Elizabeth II